Draba californica is a species of flowering plant in the family Brassicaceae, known as the California draba.

Draba californica is a small perennial herb generally not exceeding 10 centimeters in height. It forms a clump of basal leaves and extends one or more erect stems, all of which is covered in a carpetlike coat of stiff, branching hairs. The stem is covered in inflorescences of many tiny white flowers and hairy fruit pods each about a centimeter long and packed with brown seeds.

External links
Jepson Manual Treatment — Draba californica
USDA Plants Profile
Draba californica — U.C. Photo gallery

californica
Flora of California
Flora of Nevada
Endemic flora of the United States
Flora of the Great Basin
Natural history of Inyo County, California
Plants described in 1925
Flora without expected TNC conservation status